Morazha is a village of Anthoor Municipality in Kannur district in the Indian state of Kerala.  Before formation of Anthoor Municipality this village was part of Thaliparamba Municipality.  Though part of a Municipal Town, Morazha remains like a village.

The landscape of Morazha village comprises paddy fields and hilltop areas.  This village have five major portions viz. Morazha Central, Vellikkeel, Panneri, Kanool and Punnakkulangara.  While being part of a Municipal Town, the people of this village solely depends the towns in Cherukunnu and Kannapuram for their routine needs.  Most of the people are employed at said towns.

Geography
It has an average elevation of 1 metres (3 feet).

Demographics
According to the 2001 India census, Morazha had a population of 4, 389.

History

Morazha Incident
The KPCC gave a call to the people of Malabar to observe 15 September 1940 as Anti-Imperialist Day. The action was disapproved by the Congress High Command, but there were meetings and demonstrations all over in North Malabar area on this day. Morazha was the centre of this agitation. There were violent clashes between the people and the police at several places and lathicharge and firing were resorted to by the police to meet the situation.  Two young men and 23 others were killed in a clash between a mob and a police party at Morazha.  The young men were two police officers Sub-Inspector K.M Kuttikrishna Menon and Constable Raman.  In connection with this incident, K.P.R. Gopalan, a prominent communist, was arrested on a charge of murder and later sentenced to death. But, owing to the intervention of several top-ranking political leaders including Mahatma Gandhi, the death penalty was not carried out.  The Quit India Movement of August 1942 also had its echoes here in Morazha.  A socialist group among the Congress workers under Dr. K.B. Menon, provided leadership to the movement

Tourist attractions
 Vellikkeel eco-tourism
 Morazha Shiva Temple
 Sree Vaneeswari Temple
 Ozhakrome Temple
 Edappara Temple
 CH Kanaran Smaraka Vayana Sala
 Panneri Kavu
 Kairali vaayanasala, vellikkeel
 Vellikkeel river
 Vellikkeel cultural center
 Karshaka vayanashala & granthalayam, Paliyathuvalappu
 Athikulangara Temple, Paliyathuvalappu
 Panthottam Siva Temple
 Edakkeppravan Muthappan Temple

Education
 Kannur University
 Morazha Co-op Arts college
 Morazha A.U.P. School
 Morazha Central UP School
 Govt. Higher Secondary School, Morazha
 Morazha UP School
 Kanool LP school (vellikkeel)
 Gem International School
Morazha South A.L.P.School

Entertainment
 Vismaya Park
 Parassinikadav
 Snake Park
 Vellikkeel Eco-tourism

Transportation
The national highway passes through Dharmashala junction.  Mangalore and Mumbai can be accessed on the northern side and Cochin and Thiruvananthapuram can be accessed on the southern side.  The road to the east connects to Mysore and Bangalore.   The nearest railway stations are Kannapuram and Kannur on Mangalore-Palakkad line. There are airports at Kannur, Mangalore and Calicut. All of them are international airports but direct flights are available only to Middle Eastern countries.

References

See also 

 Anthoor
 Parassinikkadavu
 Kannapuram
 Cherukunnu
 Kalliasseri
 Punnakkulangara

Villages near Dharmashala, Kannur